Providence Ann Courtenay Cowdrill (born 31 March 1999) is an English cricketer who plays as a right-arm leg break bowler. She has played for Hampshire and Southern Vipers.

Early life
Cowdrill was born on 31 March 1999 in Frimley, Surrey.

Domestic career
Cowdrill made her county debut in 2015, for Hampshire against Devon, and took 3/7 from 1.5 overs. In 2016, she hit her Twenty20 high score, of 33* against Wales. In 2017, Cowdrill took 10 wickets at an average of 18.60 in the County Championship as Hampshire were promoted to Division 1. The following season, Cowdrill was the joint-leading wicket-taker across the whole competition in the Twenty20 Cup, with 15 wickets including 6/27 against Somerset, as well as taking 9 wickets as Hampshire won Division 1 of the County Championship. In 2019, she was Hampshire's leading wicket-taker in the Twenty20 Cup and joint-leading wicket-taker in the County Championship, with 12 wickets in each of the competitions.

In 2020, Cowdrill played for Southern Vipers in the Rachael Heyhoe Flint Trophy. She appeared in three matches as the side won the competition, taking 3 wickets at an average of 24.33.

References

External links

1999 births
Living people
Cricketers from Frimley
Hampshire women cricketers
Southern Vipers cricketers